Teodosije is a Serbian variant of the Greek name Theodosius, and may refer to:

Teodosije Hilandarac (1246-1328), cleric and writer
Teodosije, Metropolitan of Zeta (before 1446)
Teodosije, Bishop of Vršac (1672)
Teodosije Mraović, Metropolitan of Belgrade (1883-1889)
Teodosije Šibalić (1963- ), Serbian Bishop of Raška-Prizren

See also
Teodosić, surname

Serbian masculine given names